XXIX Brigade, Royal Field Artillery was a brigade of the Royal Field Artillery which served in the First World War.

It was originally formed with 125th, 126th and 127th Batteries, and attached to 4th Infantry Division. In August 1914, it mobilised and was sent to the continent with the British Expeditionary Force, where it saw service with 4th Division throughout the war. 128th (Howitzer) Battery joined the brigade in May 1916.

Notes

References

External links
Royal Field Artillery Brigades
4th Division Order of Battle

Royal Field Artillery brigades
Artillery units and formations of World War I